A poultry was the office in a medieval household responsible for the purchase and preparation of poultry, as well as the room in which the poultry was stored.

What it was
It was headed by a poulter or poulterer (though this last term is more often for a merchant who deals in poultry). The office was subordinated to the kitchen, and only existed as a separate office in larger households. It was closely connected with other offices of the kitchen, such as the larder and the saucery.

Use today
This use of the word is largely obsolete today.

See also
 Chicken as food

References

Medieval cuisine